Jacqueline Winspear (born 30 April 1955) is a mystery writer, author of the Maisie Dobbs series of books exploring the aftermath of World War I. She has won several mystery writing awards for books in this popular series.

Personal life and career
Winspear was born on 30 April 1955, and raised in Cranbrook, in Kent. She was educated at the University of London's Institute of Education and then worked in academic publishing, higher education and in marketing communications. She emigrated to the United States in 1990. Winspear stated that her childhood awareness of her grandfather's suffering in World War I led to an interest in that period.

Maisie Dobbs series
Maisie Dobbs is a private investigator who untangles painful and shameful secrets stemming from war experiences. A gifted working class girl in class-conscious England, she receives an unusual education thanks to the patronage of her employer, who had taken her on as a housemaid. 

She interrupts her education to work as a nurse in the Great War, falls in love and suffers her own losses. After the war, she finishes her university education, then works under the tutelage of her mentor. When he retires. she sets up as an investigator in her own office. 

Dobbs places emphasis on achieving healing for her clients and insists they comply with her ethical approach.

She grows older throughout the series of novels, and her cases reflect the times, from the Great War to the Second World War.

Books

Maisie Dobbs series
 Maisie Dobbs SOHO : 2003. , 
 Birds of a Feather (2004)
 Pardonable Lies (2005)
 Messenger of Truth (2006)
 An Incomplete Revenge (2008)
 Among the Mad (2009)
 The Mapping of Love and Death (2010)
 A Lesson in Secrets (2011)
 Elegy for Eddie (2012)
 Leaving Everything Most Loved (2013)
 A Dangerous Place (2015)
 Journey to Munich (2016)
 In This Grave Hour (2017)
 To Die but Once (2018)
 The American Agent Harper Collins, 2019. , 
The Consequences of Fear (2021) 
A Sunlit Weapon (2022)

Standalone
The Care and Management of Lies New York : HarperCollins Publishers, 2014. ,  (Ms. Winspear also narrates the Audible audio version of her childhood memoir)

Memoir 

 This Time Next Year We'll Be Laughing (2020)

References

External links
 Jacqueline Winspear, author's website

English emigrants to the United States
American mystery writers
American women novelists
Living people
Macavity Award winners
People from Cranbrook, Kent
Women mystery writers
21st-century American women writers
21st-century American novelists
Alumni of the University of London
1955 births